The Reinas de Belleza del Paraguay 2019 pageant was held at the Resort Yacht y Golf Club Paraguayo on August 7, 2019, to select Paraguayan representatives to major beauty pageants: Miss Universe, Miss World, Miss International, Miss Earth, among others. It was broadcast live on Unicanal.
There will be two groups of candidates: Miss Universe/Earth candidates; and Miss World/International candidates.

Results

Special Awards
Miss Silhouette: Jazmín Saucedo
Miss Amaszonas: Ketlin Lottermann
Miss Photogenic: Romina Godoy
Miss Elegance: Juany Ortega
Miss Talent: Araceli Bobadilla
Miss Top Model: Cayetana Ayala

Contestants
There are 16 official contestants.

Judges
The judges for the final telecast include:

Wilson Núñez
Matheus Gamba
Vivian Benítez 
Bettina Barboza de Ray 
Coral Ruiz Reyes 
Marcos Margraf 
Nelson Verá y Aragón 
César Fretes Dávalos

See also
Miss Paraguay
Miss Universe 2019
Miss World 2019
Miss International 2019
Miss Earth 2019

External links
Promociones Gloria, holder of the franchises.
Reinas de Belleza del Paraguay Facebook Page

References

2019 beauty pageants
2019 in Paraguay
2019
August 2019 events in South America